Pound Lane is a lane in Sheung Wan on Hong Kong Island, Hong Kong.

Location
Pound Lane is located between Bonham Road and Hollywood Road. The Lane runs parallel to Po Yan Street and Upper Station Street.

Name
It was the site of a government pound where straying animals, like cows and sheep, were kept. The Lane appeared on the Rates List for 1870. There was one Yee Yik occupied premises in the lane and he was a cowkeeper, while another building was occupied by one Chaoupai who was listed as a goatherd.

Nearby
 Tung Wah Hospital
 Tai Ping Shan Street
 Blake Garden
 Po Hing Fong
 Catholic Mission School
 Rutter Street
 Government Quarters, Sheung Wan
 Hospital Road
 Hop Yat Church

Second mid-level escalator
The Central and Western District Council is considering installing a new escalator on Pound Lane, the Blake Garden area could well be on its way to becoming Hong Kong's next trendy neighbourhood. Urban planning critic John Batten, who has lived in the neighbourhood for nearly 20 years, is blunt about the prospects. "The escalator would be the death of the area," he said. Noise levels would increase, prices would go up and developers would be keen to exploit the area's 30-storey height limits. "You have to wonder who is pushing this idea behind the scenes," he said. The escalator's chief proponent has been the local branch of the Democratic Alliance for the Betterment of Hong Kong, whose community relations officer, Kathy Siu Ka-yi, can be seen on dozens of posters and banners supporting the project.

See also

 List of streets and roads in Hong Kong

References

External links

 

Ladder streets in Hong Kong
Sheung Wan
Roads on Hong Kong Island